Eubaphe is a genus of moths in the family Geometridae erected by Jacob Hübner in 1823.

Species
 Eubaphe conformis (Walker, 1854)
 Eubaphe helveta (Barnes, 1907)
 Eubaphe integra (Walker, 1866)
 Eubaphe lineata (Druce, 1885)
 Eubaphe medea (Druce, 1885)
 Eubaphe mendica (Walker, 1854)
 Eubaphe meridiana (Slosson, 1889)
 Eubaphe rotundata (Cassino & Swett, 1922)
 Eubaphe tripunctata (Druce, 1885)
 Eubaphe unicolor (Robinson, 1869)

References

Eudulini
Geometridae genera